Jeremy Molitor is a Canadian former boxer and Commonwealth Games gold medalist, currently on parole for second-degree murder.

Boxing career
Molitor and his younger brother Steve were known as the "Bruise Brothers", as they rose from Sarnia's gyms to the top of Canada's amateur boxing ranks in the late 1990s. Both siblings were educated at Northern Collegiate Institute and Vocational School (NCIVS). A former nine-time national amateur champion, Molitor gained attention at the 1998 Commonwealth Games held at Kuala Lumpur. There, he won the Welterweight (67 kg) title, defeating Absolom Okoth of Kenya 14–9 to claim the gold medal. He dropped the puck for an OHL game between the Sarnia Sting and Kitchener Rangers held in Sarnia, and had some minor sponsorship deals.

Molitor failed to qualify for the 2000 Summer Olympics due to suffering a broken hand three days before the Sydney 2000 team trials. His career declined as he battled addictions to cocaine and alcohol and failed to maintain his former training regime. He tried moving to Toronto for several months to train with his up-and-coming brother, but his personal problems continued.

His younger brother Steve Molitor is a former professional boxer, who held the International Boxing Federation light featherweight championship.

Conviction
On May 4, 2002, five months after moving back to Sarnia, he attacked his ex-girlfriend, 21-year-old Jessica Nethery, in a parking lot and stabbed her 58 times. She bled to death. At the time, Molitor was under a restraining order to stay away from his former girlfriend, whom he had previously abused. Molitor was also listed in police reports as being under the influence of drugs and alcohol at the time.

In December 2004, Molitor was convicted of second-degree murder, and the following May was sentenced to life in prison with no chance of parole for 14 years. Molitor was housed at Millhaven Institution near Kingston, Ontario. With credit for time already served he could apply for parole in 2016.

Parole
On November 26, 2015, Molitor was granted day parole after appealing a previous decision to deny parole in November 2014. The appeal was granted on the grounds that members of the board reported they weren't convinced Molitor's "tendency to manipulate others has in fact ended," according to a copy of the board's decision. Molitor was eventually granted full parole in 2019.

References

1977 births
Living people
Sportspeople from Sarnia
Boxing people from Ontario
Welterweight boxers
Commonwealth Games gold medallists for Canada
Boxers at the 1998 Commonwealth Games
Canadian people convicted of murder
Canadian prisoners sentenced to life imprisonment
Prisoners sentenced to life imprisonment by Canada
People convicted of murder by Canada
Boxers at the 1999 Pan American Games
Pan American Games silver medalists for Canada
Place of birth missing (living people)
Canadian male boxers
Commonwealth Games medallists in boxing
Pan American Games medalists in boxing
Medalists at the 1999 Pan American Games
Medallists at the 1998 Commonwealth Games